The Skanderbeg Mountains ( or ) are a mountain range in Albania, Southern Europe.

Geography
Skanderbeg Mountain is located on the border between the district of Kruja and that of Mat with the highest altitude 1724 m (Lake Peak). It stretches from the valley of the river Mat in the north and to Qafa e Shtama in the south, with a length of 22 km and a width of 2-5 km. It is part of the Western Mountains. The relief is very fragmented by streams, tributaries of the Mati and Ishm rivers. The slopes are steep, while the wavy relief, places with glacial and karst forms. On the northeast side, about 200 m below the highest peak, there are two small glacial lakes, which have given the name to the peak. The mountain is lined with dense vegetation.

See also 
 Albanian Adriatic Sea Coast 
 Geography of Albania
 Geology of Albania

References 
2. https://shqipful.com/

Mountain ranges of Albania
Geography of Southeastern Europe